Michael Maue (born 18 May 1960) is a German former cyclist. He competed in the team time trial event at the 1984 Summer Olympics.

References

External links
 

1960 births
Living people
People from Kaiserslautern
German male cyclists
Olympic cyclists of West Germany
Cyclists at the 1984 Summer Olympics
Cyclists from Rhineland-Palatinate